Warszawa Zoo railway station is a railway station in the Praga Północ district of Warsaw, Poland. It was built on the Warsaw orbital line, which goes through Warszawa Gdańska station. As of 2011, it is used by Koleje Mazowieckie, who run the KM9 services from Warszawa Wola through the north of the Masovian Voivodeship to Działdowo, in the Warmian-Masurian Voivodeship via Legionowo, Nasielsk, Modlin, Ciechanów and Mława, at all of which some trains terminate, and by Szybka Kolej Miejska, who run services to Wieliszew, with some trains terminating at Legionowo or Legionowo Piaski. The station is located near to Warsaw Zoo.

References
Station article at kolej.one.pl

External links 
 

Zoo
Railway stations served by Koleje Mazowieckie
Railway stations served by Szybka Kolej Miejska (Warsaw)